The Name of the Rose may refer to:

 The Name of the Rose (Il nome della rosa), a 1980 Italian novel
 The Name of the Rose (film), the 1986 film adaptation
 The Name of the Rose, a 2008 board game based on the novel, published by Ravensburger
 The Name of the Rose (miniseries), a television miniseries adaptation released in 2019

 The Name of the Rose (album), a 1996 studio album by Ten, featuring an eponymous 8:31 minute track 
 The Name of the Rose (EP), an EP by Ten, released in 1996
"The Name of the Rose", the titles of the Edit version (6:15) and Karaoke version (8:43) tracks on Ten's EP, written by Gary Hughes

See also
 "Au nom de la rose", a 1999 French song by Moos